Below is a list of the 18 states of the Sudan (Arabic names are in parentheses). Prior to 9 July 2011, the Republic of the Sudan was composed of 25 states. The ten southern states now form part of the independent country of South Sudan. Two additional states were created in 2012 within the Darfur region, and one in 2013 in Kordofan, bringing the total to 18.

States of the Republic of Sudan
The following 18 states form the territory of the Republic of the Sudan:

 Khartoum (ولاية خرطوم Wilāyat Kharṭūm)
 North Kordofan (ولاية شمال كردفان Wilāyat Shamāl Kurdufān)
 Northern (ولاية الشمالية Wilāyat ash-Shamāliyyah)
 Kassala (ولاية كسّلا Wilāyat Kassalā)
 Blue Nile (ولاية النيل الأزرق Wilāyat an-Nīl al-Azraq)
 North Darfur (ولاية شمال دارفور Wilāyat Shamāl Dārfūr)
 South Darfur (ولاية جنوب دارفور Wilāyat Janūb Dārfūr)
 South Kordofan (ولاية جنوب كردفان Wilāyat Janūb Kurdufān)
 Al Jazirah (ولاية الجزيرة Wilāyat al-Jazīrah)
 White Nile (ولاية النيل الأبيض Wilāyat an-Nīl al-Abyaḍ)
 River Nile (ولاية نهر النيل Wilāyat Nahr an-Nīl)
 Red Sea (ولاية البحر الأحمر Wilāyat al-Baḥr al-Aḥmar)
 Al Qadarif (ولاية القضارف Wilāyat al-Qaḍārif)
 Sennar (ولاية سنّار Wilāyat Sinnār)
 West Darfur (ولاية غرب دارفور Wilāyat Gharb Dārfūr)
 Central Darfur (ولاية وسط دارفور Wilāyat Wasṭ Dārfūr)
 East Darfur (ولاية شرق دارفور Wilāyat Sharq Dārfūr)
 West Kordofan (ولاية غرب كردفان Wilāyat Gharb Kurdufān) (disestablished in 2005; reestablished in 2013)

Special administrative areas
 The Abyei Area, located on the border between South Sudan and the Republic of the Sudan, currently has a special administrative status and is governed by an Abyei Area Administration. It was due to hold a referendum in 2011 on whether to be part of South Sudan or part of the Republic of Sudan.

Regional bodies
In addition to the states, there also exist regional administrative bodies established by peace agreements between the central government and rebel groups:
 The Darfur Regional Government was established by the Darfur Peace Agreement to act as a co-ordinating body for the states that make up the region of Darfur.
 The Eastern Sudan States Coordinating Council was established by the Eastern Sudan Peace Agreement between the Sudanese Government and the rebel Eastern Front to act as a coordinating body for the three eastern states.

History

Anglo-Egyptian Sudan had eight mudiriyat, or provinces, which were ambiguous when created but became well defined by the beginning of World War II.  The eight provinces were: Blue Nile, Darfur, Equatoria, Kassala, Khartoum, Kurdufan, Northern, and Upper Nile. In 1948, Bahr al Ghazal split from Equatoria.

There were numerous new provinces created on 1 July 1973.  North and South Darfur were created from Darfur, while Kurdufan divided into North and South Kordofan.  Al Jazirah and White Nile were split off from Blue Nile.  River Nile split off from Northern.  Red Sea was split off from Kassala.

A further fracturing of provinces occurred in 1976.  Lakes split from Bahr al Ghazal, and Jonglei split off from Upper Nile.  Equatoria divided into East and Western Equatoria.  There were thus eighteen provinces.  In 1991, the government reorganized the administrative regions into nine federal states, matching the nine provinces that had existed from 1948 to 1973.  On 14 February 1994, the government reorganized yet again, creating twenty-six wilayat (states).  The majority of the wilayat were either the old provinces or administrative subregions of a province.  As part of the new government structure in South Sudan in 2005, Bahr al Jabal was renamed Central Equatoria. In 2006, West Kurdufan was split and merged with North Kurdufan and South Kordofan.

In January 2012, the new states of Central Darfur and East Darfur were created in the Darfur region, bringing the total number of states to 17. In July 2013, West Kurdufan was reestablished.

Since April 2019, states in Sudan have been without state governments and legislative councils.

Former states now part of South Sudan

On 9 July 2011, the ten southern states became the independent country of South Sudan. They were further divided into 86 counties.

See also
ISO 3166-2:SD
List of current state governors in Sudan
List of Sudanese states by Human Development Index
States of South Sudan — first-level administrative division of the Republic of South Sudan

References

External links
 
 States of Sudan. 
 2008 Census Results , Central Bureau of Statistics

 
Subdivisions of Sudan
Sudan 1
Sudan geography-related lists

fr:Subdivisions du Soudan#États